Ryan James Pinkston (born February 8, 1988) is an American actor and model. He was a cast member on Punk'd, he played Arnold in the Spy Kids films, and played Billy Hunkee in Soul Plane.

Life and career
Pinkston was born in Silver Spring, Maryland, the son of Linda and Mark Pinkston. He is of partial Greek descent. Pinkston appeared on Star Search at the age of twelve and was subsequently a cast member on Ashton Kutcher's MTV show Punk'd. (He bears no relation to Rob Pinkston, another Punk'd alumnus.)

He starred in the sitcom Quintuplets; his older brother, Aaron, made guest appearances on the show. He graduated from River Hill High School in Clarksville, Maryland, in 2006.

Full of It opened on March 2, 2007; in the film, he plays a high school senior who lies to become popular. The film also premiered on ABC Family on September 16, 2007, and was released on DVD on September 25, 2007. He appeared in Lionsgate's College in 2008, alongside Drake Bell and Andrew Caldwell. He also appeared in Hannah Montana, which came out in 2006. His role is Connor, a friend of Oliver, and Miley falls for him, but later finds out how short he is and dumps him.

Filmography

Film

Television

Awards and nominations

Notes

References

External links
 Official site
 
 Full of It's MySpace page

1988 births
Living people
American male child actors
American male film actors
American people of Greek descent
American male television actors
People from Howard County, Maryland
People from Silver Spring, Maryland
21st-century American male actors